Lisa Patterson is a multi-instrumentalist, vocalist, songwriter, performer, producer/engineer and educator. A classically trained musician, she went directly from high school to study audio engineering and production at Fanshawe College, London, Ontario, and later attended Toronto’s York University as a performance major focusing on South Indian music, Composition and Contemporary Improvisation. She has been active as a side musician and solo recording artist touring in North America, India, Mexico, Europe and the Middle East. While her main instrument is piano, Lisa performs frequently on alto saxophone and duduk.

She was born in Canada to a Scottish father, Rob Patterson and a Canadian mother of Romanian descent, Elaine Gherasim, who died in 2006.

Since 1999 Lisa is founder and director of imaginit music, a Toronto-based company that operates as a brick and mortar multi-use recording, rehearsal and teaching studio. imaginit music has presented multi-disciplinary and culturally diverse events in Toronto such as Forward Festival (Lula Lounge) and Musiques Sans Frontieres (Drake Hotel) as well as her own concerts in South India in association with Alliance Française.

As a recording/performing artist Lisa has commercially released two solo albums and three music videos (Festival Distribution/Canada; Rough Trade Records/Europe) enjoying three Top Ten-charted singles in The Benelux. With longtime band-mate cellist/vocalist Alex McMaster, Lisa launched ROAM in 2007, a collaborative duo that takes its name from Lisa’s second album title. ROAM’s debut album Points of Departure [March 2009] has been well received by CBC Radio programs The Signal, Here & Now, Metro Morning and Fresh Air - which included a 3O-minute feature interview. Performance highlights include Canadian Connections Fair in the Netherlands; west coast and Ontario/Quebec tours; Canadian Music Week Amnesty International showcase 2009; Toronto Symphony Orchestra soiree; Toronto residency with notable guest artists; Symphony in the Barn Concert Series in Durham, Ontario. ROAM is grows as a collaborative project with fluid membership including Rakkatak’s Anita Kattakar (tabla) and Oriana Barbato (guitar), and Sarv Ensemble’s Kousha Nikhaie (kamancheh).

Lisa’s songs have appeared in award-winning documentaries, shorts and feature films, including Bruce McDonald’s Roadkill, Charles Johnston’s Tête à tête, Darrell Wasyk’s H and Ingrid Veninger’s Three Sisters On Moon Lake. Her most recent single "Silver Lining", featuring Alex McMaster and recorded by Adam Messinger (Jully Black, Ivana Santilli, New Kids On The Block) was written as a tribute to the hidden blessings in loss after losing her mother to breast cancer.

As a producer/engineer Lisa has worked on over 10 commercially released discs and scores of demos from artists as diverse as urban jazz diva Rita di Ghent, North Indian fusionists Toronto Tabla Ensemble and pop singer Emm Gryner. Successes include creating the latest album from award-winning Aboriginal Roots singer Brenda MacIntyre [number 1 on ReverbNation.com, winter 2010] and the debut disc for Haitian-Canadian artist Mélissa Laveaux - now a European rising star based in Paris – resulting in a signing to France label No Format!/Universal.

Lisa has collaborated and studied with African, South Asian, Aboriginal, Middle Eastern and Eastern European artists and brings social consciousness to all her work as exemplified by affiliations with Stephen Lewis Foundation, Amnesty International and Alliance Française. Collaboration highlights include vocalist/musician Maryem Tollar, tabla and Ghazal maestro Cassius Khan, and esteemed musicians in South India including Darbuka Siva (percussion), Rahul Pophali (tabla), Navin Iyer (flutes), Venkata Subramanian (mrdangam) and Prakash (bass).

Lisa is an active mentor and coordinator in community arts programs. She has facilitated and presented youth songwriting workshops and performance showcases and was a mentor at the 2009 OCFF conference in Ottawa and the 2010 Canadian Music Week in Toronto. She has been a company member of Toronto Playback Theatre since 2004, improvising live soundtracks for private and public performances, as well as being coordinator for multiple programs focusing on at-risk youth, cultural diversity and anti-violence.

Career initiatives supported by: F.A.C.T.O.R.; DFAIT Department of Foreign Affairs and International Trade; Canada Council for the Arts; VideoFACT & Bravo!FACT; Ontario & Toronto Arts Council. 
Recognition includes: Leonardo da Vinci Award for Creativity and Innovation; Paul Casino Achievement Award York University; Fanshawe College Producer of the Year nomination.

She was active in post-punk and new wave bands in London, Ontario, Canada in the 1980s where she played with original recording and touring bands Sheep Look Up; Suffer Machine; and Edna and Edna.

References

External links
 Lisa Patterson at Discogs

Canadian women pianists
Living people
Canadian educators
Canadian record producers
Canadian songwriters
Canadian people of Scottish descent
Canadian people of Romanian descent
21st-century Canadian pianists
Canadian women record producers
21st-century Canadian women musicians
Year of birth missing (living people)
21st-century women pianists